Bear McCreary (born February 17, 1979) is an American musician and composer of film, television, and video game scores based in Los Angeles, California. His work includes the scores of the television series Battlestar Galactica (2004), Agents of S.H.I.E.L.D., Outlander, The Walking Dead, The Lord of the Rings: The Rings of Power, The Serpent Queen, the video games Call of Duty: Vanguard, God of War and God of War Ragnarök, and the film Godzilla: King of the Monsters.

McCreary has been nominated for an Emmy for Outstanding Music Composition for a Series for his work on season one of Outlander and won one Emmy for the main title of Da Vinci's Demons. He has also won a BAFTA for his work on God of War.

Early life and education 
McCreary spent most of his formative years in Bellingham, Washington. He is the son of author Laura Kalpakian and professor Jay McCreary of University of Hawaii at Manoa. His brother, Brendan McCreary, is also a musician. Bear has directed and produced several music videos for Brendan's band, "Young Beautiful in a Hurry". He graduated from Bellingham High School in 1997.

He is a classically trained pianist and self-taught accordionist. He studied under the renowned film score composer Elmer Bernstein during which time he reconstructed and reorchestrated Bernstein's 1963 score for Kings of the Sun.  Their collaboration allowed for the complete score to be available as a soundtrack album for the first time in 40 years.

McCreary went to USC Thornton School of Music at the encouragement of Elmer Bernstein becoming his protégé and graduating in 2002 from Screen Scoring.

Career

Television

Battlestar Galactica and Caprica 

In 2003, McCreary worked under primary composer Richard Gibbs on the three-hour miniseries which served as a pilot for the reimagined series of Battlestar Galactica. When the show was picked up, Gibbs opted not to devote full-time to the regular series' production, and McCreary became the sole composer. He worked on the series until it reached its conclusion in 2009, scoring over 70 episodes. To date, six Battlestar Galactica soundtrack albums have been released, and have garnered a great deal of critical acclaim and commercial success. The soundtracks for seasons two and three ranked amongst Amazon.com's Top 30 Music Sales on their first days of release.

McCreary composed for the Battlestar Galactica prequel series Caprica and Battlestar Galactica: Blood and Chrome.

Human Target 
McCreary provided the score for the series Human Target (based on the comic book of the same name). The pilot episode and main theme score had been recorded with a full orchestra. The series has the distinction of having one of the largest orchestras on television.

The score to the finale of season one, "Christopher Chance", used the largest orchestra ever assembled for episodic television, and he took the opportunity to rerecord the main title theme with a new orchestration with this larger ensemble.

In July 2010, he received his first Emmy nomination for the Human Target main title.

In a post on his blog on July 25, 2010, McCreary announced the new creative leadership brought in for season two had not asked him to return for it, and he would be leaving the series.

Black Sails 
The opening title sequence for Black Sails was composed by McCreary with a backing sea shanty inspired theme. It accurately features an instrument of the period in the form of the hurdy-gurdy.

Outlander 
McCreary composed the soundtrack for each of the first five seasons of Outlander. The main title was sung by his long time collaborator and partner, Raya Yarbrough.

In 2015, McCreary was nominated for an Emmy for the pilot Outlander episode "Sassenach" (S01E01; 2014-08-09).

Other series 
During Comic-Con 2010, Bear McCreary attended panels for AMC's The Walking Dead and NBC's The Cape to announce he would be composing the score for both television series.

On July 15, 2013, McCreary announced that he would compose the score for ABC's series Agents of S.H.I.E.L.D. On September 4, 2015, McCreary released the official Agents of S.H.I.E.L.D. soundtrack publicly.

McCreary served as orchestral producer for the rock opera Metalocalypse: The Doomstar Requiem airing on Adult Swim on October 27, 2013. This is a continuation of the Metalocalypse universe following the band Dethklok. The music features a 50-piece orchestra. The soundtrack was released on October 29, 2013.

McCreary also composed the score for the television series Snowpiercer which premiered on TNT May 17, 2020. Snowpiercer was also distributed online via Netflix.

The score for the Masters of the Universe: Revelation series on Netflix was composed by McCreary

McCreary composed the theme and music for the television series Foundation, an Apple TV+ series adapted from Isaac Asimov’s novels. The Season 1 soundtrack was released on September 24, 2021. The next year, he composed the score for the Amazon Prime Video fantasy television series The Lord of the Rings: The Rings of Power, releasing an album along each episode.

Films 
McCreary worked on several films providing additional music and conducting for My Baby's Daddy and Johnson Family Vacation before striking off on his own and scoring Rest Stop and Wrong Turn 2: Dead End, both direct to video.

After working with Shawn Papazian on Rest Stop: Don't Look Back, the sequel to Rest Stop. McCreary made his theatrical film debut with Step Up 3D

Following Step Up 3D, he scored three films directed by Joe Lynch, Chillerama, Knights of Badassdom and Everly. Everly's soundtrack included a duet McCreary sang with his wife, Raya Yarbrough.

McCreary has only worked with a few directors multiple times: Christopher Landon on three films, Happy Death Day, Happy Death Day 2U and Freaky; and director McG twice on Rim of the World and The Babysitter: Killer Queen.

Other notable film scores include Angry Video Game Nerd: The Movie, 10 Cloverfield Lane, The Cloverfield Paradox, Child's Play (2019 film), and Godzilla: King of the Monsters.

McCreary's latest feature scores include Ava, The Babysitter: Killer Queen, Freaky and Paws of Fury: The Legend of Hank.

Video games 
McCreary made an eight-bit rendition of the Dark Void theme, which was, originally, an April fools joke. However, the theme was used for the prequel, Dark Void Zero. He composed all the songs in an eight-bit fashion by connecting the wires on an actual NES console and cartridge to create authenticity.

He arranged James Rolfe's The Angry Video Game Nerd "You're a Mean One, Mr. Grinch" parody "You're a Mean One, Mr. Nerd" for the 2010 Christmas special, with orchestra and eight-bit audio elements.

McCreary also performed with his orchestra live at Sony's E3 2016 press conference throughout the show and composed the score of the 2018 God of War game. He also composed the music for its 2022 sequel, God of War Ragnarök, for which he also plays a minor character in the game, a Dwarf named Ræb.

In 2021, McCreary composed the score for Call of Duty: Vanguard.

Personal life
McCreary married singer and songwriter Raya Yarbrough in 2010. They have collaborated on the music of Battlestar Galactica, Outlander, Defiance, Da Vinci's Demons, among other projects. Their daughter Sonatine, named after the musical term sonatina, was born on June 2, 2014.

Influences
McCreary credits composers Jerry Goldsmith, Elmer Bernstein, Danny Elfman, Ennio Morricone, John Williams, and Shirley Walker as being key to his growing up adoring film music. They were his heroes while he was growing up. Contemporary composers including Hans Zimmer continue to inspire McCreary's growth.

Works

Films

Television

Video games

Awards and nominations

References

External links
 
Official website
MAFgest 2016 interview
Audio Interview on GeeksOn!
[https://www.academia.edu/7231992/Of_Duduks_and_Dylan_Negotiating_Music_and_the_Aural_Space_in_Battlestar_Galactica "Of Duduks and Dylan: Negotiating Music and the Aural Space in Battlestar Galactica''''], by Eftychia Papanikolaou; chapter in Cylons in America: Critical Studies of Battlestar Galactica'', edited by Tiffany Potter and C. W. Marshall, 224–236. New York and London: Continuum, 2007.

1979 births
American accordionists
American film score composers
American people of Armenian descent
American television composers
Living people
Male television composers
Musicians from Washington (state)
People from Bellingham, Washington
USC Thornton School of Music alumni
21st-century accordionists
American male film score composers
21st-century American male musicians
La-La Land Records artists
Video game composers